Kim Sun-young (born April 10, 1976) is a South Korean actress. She has performed in a variety of popular dramas, including Reply 1988 (2015), Because This is My First Life (2018), Romance is a Bonus Book (2019), When the Camellia Blooms (2019), Vagabond (2019), Crash Landing On You (2019), and Backstreet Rookie (2020). She won the Best Supporting Actress award at the Chunsa Film Art Awards and Wildflower Film Awards for her performance in Communications and Lies. Kim has received the Best Supporting Actress Award at the 56th Baeksang Arts Awards for her role on Crash Landing On You.

Career
Kim debuted as a theatre actor in 1995 in the play After the Play is Over. Though she debuted in films in 2005 with She's on Duty, her television debut was in 2014 with a minor role in the MBC drama series Hotel King.

Filmography

Film

Television series

Web series

Theater

Awards and nominations

References

External links
 Kim Sunyoung at Jellyfish Entertainment
 

Jellyfish Entertainment artists
1976 births
People from North Gyeongsang Province
Living people
21st-century South Korean actresses
South Korean film actresses
South Korean television actresses
South Korean stage actresses
Best Supporting Actress Paeksang Arts Award (film) winners